Yuri Georgievich Felshtinsky (born 7 September 1956 in Moscow) is a Russian American historian. Felshtinsky has authored a number of books on Russian history, including The Bolsheviks and the Left SRs (Paris, 1985), Towards a History of Our Isolation (London, 1988; Moscow, 1991), The Failure of the World Revolution (London, 1991; Moscow, 1992), Blowing up Russia (with Alexander Litvinenko), and The Age of Assassins (with Vladimir Pribylovsky).

Education
Felshtinsky's parents died when he was 17 years of age. He began studying history in 1974 at Moscow State Pedagogical University. A couple of years later, he decided to emigrate from the Soviet Union to Israel, travelling first to Vienna. But instead of going from Vienna to Israel, he went further to the United States, where he arrived in April 1978 and there subsequently continued his studies. He graduated from Brandeis University and earned his PhD in history from Rutgers University. In 1993, he returned to Moscow and defended his Doctor of Science thesis at the Institute of Russian History of the Russian Academy of Sciences, becoming the first non-Russian citizen to earn a doctorate from a Russian university.

Career

Felshtinsky has published a number of books on the history of the Communist movement. In one of those books, Leaders the Mobsters, he described the Bolshevik party as a Mafia-like organization where "almost no one died by a natural cause". According to Felshtinsky, the list of assassinations includes poisoning of Vladimir Lenin, Felix Dzerzhinsky, and Maksim Gorky by Genrikh Yagoda on orders from Joseph Stalin, murders of Mikhail Frunze, Vyacheslav Menzhinsky, and Leon Trotsky, and the poisoning of Stalin by associates of Lavrentiy Beria.

In 1998, Felshtinsky traveled back to Moscow in order to study the politics of contemporary Russia. At that time, he became acquainted with Alexander Litvinenko, a lieutenant colonel of the Federal Security Service (FSB). In 2000, Felshtinsky and Litvinenko began working on Blowing Up Russia, a book that describes the gradual appropriation of power in Russia by the security apparatus and details the FSB's involvement in a series of terrorist acts that took place between 1994 and 1999. In August 2001, several chapters from Blowing Up Russia were published in a special edition of the newspaper Novaya Gazeta. In 2002, the book became the basis for a documentary film, Blowing Up Russia (also known as Assassination of Russia). Both the book and the documentary were officially banned in Russia for "divulging state secrets". Until 2006, Felshtinsky continued working with Litvinenko on gathering additional materials documenting the FSB's involvement in the apartment house bombings of September 1999. According to the authors, the bombings were committed by the Russian Federal Security Service (FSB), as a false flag operation intended to justify the Second Chechen War.

In November 2006, Litvinenko died in London of acute radiation syndrome, three weeks after being poisoned with polonium-210. (See Poisoning of Alexander Litvinenko).

In 2007, investigator Mikhail Trepashkin said that, according to his FSB sources, "everyone who was involved in the publication of the book Blowing Up Russia will be killed," and that three FSB agents had made a trip to Boston to prepare the assassination of Felshtinsky. After the death of exiled oligarch Boris Berezovsky, who sponsored the book, Felshtinsky suggested that Berezovsky was killed.

List of selected publications
The legal foundations of the immigration and emigration policy of the USSR, 1917 - 1927 (Glasgow, 1982) 
The Bolsheviks and the Left SRS (Paris, 1985)
Trotsky's Notebooks, 1933–1935. Writings on Lenin, Dialectics, and Evolutionism. (New York, 1986) 
Towards a History of Our Isolation (London, 1988; Moscow,  1991)
Conversations with Bukharin (Moscow, 1993)
Lenin, Trotsky, Stalin and the Left Opposition in the USSR, 1918 - 1928 (Paris, 1990)
The Failure of World Revolution (London, 1991; Moscow, 1992)
Big Bosses (Moscow, 1999) 

with Vladimir Pribylovsky, The Corporation. Russia and the KGB in the Age of President Putin, Encounter Books; 25 February 2009, description.
 description.
Boris Gulko, Yuri Felshtinsky, Vladimir Popov, Viktor Kortschnoi, The KGB Plays Chess: The Soviet Secret Police and the Fight for the World Chess Crown. Russell Enterprises, Inc. 2011, .
Yuri Felshtinsky and M. Stanchev. World War III. Battle for Ukraine, Our Format (Ukraine), 2015. (Фельштинский Ю., Станчев М. Третья мировая. Битва за Украину. — К.: Наш формат, 2015), ISBN 978-966-97425-9-9.
Yuri Felshtinsky, Vladimir Popov, From Red Terror to Mafia State: Russia's State Security in the Struggle for World Domination Encounter Books, 2022, 
Yuri Felshtinsky and M. Stanchev, Blowing up Ukraine: The Return of Russian Terror and the Threat of World War III, Gibson Square Books Ltd, 2022,

Interviews

References

External links

20th-century Russian historians
1956 births
Writers from Moscow
Living people
21st-century American historians
American male non-fiction writers
Historians of Russia
Russian political scientists
Russian political writers
Stalinism-era scholars and writers
Writers about Russia
Writers about the Soviet Union
Rutgers University alumni
Brandeis University alumni
Soviet emigrants to the United States
21st-century American male writers